Leake is a hamlet and civil parish in the Hambleton district of North Yorkshire, England, about six miles north of Thirsk.  The population of the parish was estimated at 10 in 2010. With the population in 2011 being less than 100 information is contained in the civil parish of Borrowby, Hambleton.

The settlement was mentioned in the Domesday Book and the name of the hamlet derives from the Old English Lece or Lecan which means to drip or leak. All other places in England that are named Leake are situated near to water and an alternative etymology would be that Lece may be an Old English word for brook.

Leake Hall is a grade II* listed house which dates from the 17th century. Originally built in 3 storeys to an H-shaped floor plan it now has a T-shaped layout with a 6-bay frontage. It is now a farmhouse.
 
The grade I listed Church of St Mary dates from Norman times. The Norman tower has a Saxon cross built into it. The bench ends for the choir stalls in the chancel were rescued from Bridlington Priory at the Dissolution.

References

External links
 St Mary the Virgin Church Leake official website

Villages in North Yorkshire
Civil parishes in North Yorkshire